5th VFCC Awards
February 20, 2005

Best Film: 
 Sideways 

Best Canadian Film: 
 Childstar 
The 5th Vancouver Film Critics Circle Awards, honoring the best in filmmaking in 2004, were given on 20 February 2005.

Winners

International
Best Actor: 
Jamie Foxx - Ray
Best Actress: 
Imelda Staunton - Vera Drake
Best Director: 
Clint Eastwood - Million Dollar Baby
Best Documentary Feature: 
Fahrenheit 9/11
Best Film: 
Sideways
Best Foreign Language Film: 
Un long dimanche de fiançailles (A Very Long Engagement), France
Best Supporting Actor: 
Morgan Freeman - Million Dollar Baby
Best Supporting Actress: 
Virginia Madsen - Sideways

Canadian
Best Actor: 
Don McKellar - Childstar
Best Actress: 
Joely Collins - The Love Crimes of Gillian Guess
Best Director: 
Don McKellar - Childstar
Best Film: 
Childstar
Best Supporting Actor: 
Dave Foley - Childstar
Best Supporting Actress: 
Rebecca Jenkins - Wilby Wonderful

2004
2004 film awards
2004 in British Columbia
2004 in Canadian cinema